Barbara Vanderhyden is a Canadian scientific researcher, currently the Corinne Bayer Chair in Ovarian Cancer Research at University of Ottawa Hospital Research Institute.

Awards 

 In 2014 Vanderhyden received the Grimes Research Career Achievement Award for her work on ovarian cancer.

References

Year of birth missing (living people)
Living people
Academic staff of the University of Ottawa
Canadian physiologists